Curiúva is a municipality in the state of Paraná in the Southern Region of Brazil.

Notable Citizens
Sebastião "Capa" Bueno da Silva - Government Agent
José "Zé Bila" da Silva - Musician

See also
List of municipalities in Paraná

References

Municipalities in Paraná